South Sumter High School is a public high school in Bushnell, Sumter County, Florida. Its teams are the Raiders and its school colors are Red, Black and White.

Athletics
South Sumter Raiders have had one of the longest winning high school football teams in Florida since 2000, and earned the top ranking in Division 4A in a 2012 Associated Press poll. The team won their division and were 11–1 overall in 2012. Dallas Cowboys Linebacker Keanu Neal played for the Raiders.

Other competition sports include: Baseball, Basketball, Golf, Soccer, Softball, Track, Volleyball and Weightlifting.

Notable alumni
Keanu Neal - Current NFL player for the Tampa Bay Buccaneers
Clinton Hart - Former NFL player for the Philadelphia Eagles, San Diego Chargers, and St. Louis Rams
Earl Everett- Former Florida Gators football linebacker and Former NFL player

References

External links
 South Sumter High School website
 Sumter District Schools website

Educational institutions in the United States with year of establishment missing
Public high schools in Florida
Schools in Sumter County, Florida